Vesyoly is a rural locality (a village) in Krasnovoskhodsky Selsoviet, Iglinsky District, Bashkortostan, Russia. The population was 12 as of 2010. There is 1 street.

Geography 
Vesyoly is located 59 km northeast of Iglino (the district's administrative centre) by road. Kirovsky is the nearest rural locality.

References 

Rural localities in Iglinsky District